Once Upon A Time In Kolkata is a  2014 Bengali thriller film directed by Satarupa Sanyal. The film features Ritabhari Chakraborty in the lead role.

Plot
This is the story of a gangster, Arjan Panda who is highly professional. He lover and worships his wife Sreelekha like a goddess. But Sreelekha can not accept the lifestyle of Arjun.

Cast 
 Ritabhari Chakraborty as Sreelekha
 Rajatava Dutta  as Jiten
 Om as Arjan Panda
 Rony Chakraborty as Sayan
 Nimisha Dey Sarkar as Puja
 Sudip Mukherjee as Banerjeeda
 Dwijen Banerjee as Landlord
 Anindya Banerjee as Baptu
 deepak soni as parth

References 

Bengali-language Indian films
2010s Bengali-language films
Indian thriller films
Films set in Kolkata
2014 thriller films